Every Little Word may refer to:

 Every Little Word (album), a 1994 album by Hal Ketchum, or the title song
 "Every Little Word" (song), a 2014 song by MNEK
"Every Little Word", a 1990 single by Flesh for Lulu
 "Every Little Word", a song by Sera Cahoone, from the 2012 album Deer Creek Canyon